Pecteilis gigantea  is fragrant orchid species found in hilly evergreen forests in India at height 1800 ft. above sea level.

References

External links
 
 

gigantea